Bagheli-ye Marama Rural District is a rural district (dehestan) in the Central District of Gonbad-e Qabus County, Golestan Province, Iran. At the 2006 census, its population was 33,148, in 7,179 families.  The rural district has 41 villages.

References 

Rural Districts of Golestan Province
Gonbad-e Kavus County